Leighton Eksteen (born 15 September 1994 in Riversdale, South Africa) is a South African rugby union player for VVA Podmoskovje in the Professional Rugby League in Russia. He is a utility back that can play as a fullback, fly-half or scrum-half.

Playing career

Youth rugby and SWD Eagles

In 2012, Eksteen was selected to represent the George-based  at the premier South African rugby union competition for high schools, the Under-18 Craven Week, held in Port Elizabeth, scoring a try in their 33–39 defeat to Western Province.

He joined the SWD Academy after leaving school and made four appearances for the s in the 2013 Under-19 Provincial Championship. He made just four appearances for them in the competition – three starts and one appearance off the bench – but was their top scorer in the competition with 76 points. That placed him as the third-highest points scorer in Group B of the competition. He scored six tries in his four appearances, which included a hat-trick in their match against the s, which saw him score 30 of his side's points in a 55–12 victory.

He was included in the  squad that participated in the 2014 Under-21 Provincial Championship. However, he just in just two matches against  and  – scoring 21 points through one try and eight conversions in the latter match – before being joining the ' senior squad for the 2014 Currie Cup First Division. With the senior side's season over, he rejoined the Under-21 side that reached the final of Group B of the Under-21 Provincial Championship, starting the match and scoring his side's only points as the s won the match 46–3.

Despite still being eligible to represent SWD at Under-21 level in 2015, he exclusively played for the senior side. He played off the bench in all eight of their 2015 Vodacom Cup matches. However, that was his side's only victory in the competition as they finished bottom of the log and qualifying to play in the 2015 Currie Cup First Division competition. Eksteen was handed the kicking duties during this competition and it coincided with a big turnaround in fortunes, as the SWD Eagles won four out of their five matches, to finish in third spot on the log to qualify for the semi-finals. Eksteen contributed 102 points in these five matches to not only be the SWD Eagles' top scorer in the competition, but also the overall top scorer, ahead of champions ' Adriaan Engelbrecht. He kicked ten points in the final, but it was not enough, as the Leopards ran out 44–20 winners.

Southern Kings

At the start of 2016, Eksteen was one of two SWD Eagles players that joined the ' Super Rugby squad for a trial period as they prepared for the 2016 Super Rugby season.

VVA Podmoskovye 
In 2019, Eksteen joined the Russian team VVA Podmoskovye (ex. VVA Saracens). In the Russian Rugby Cup 2021, he became the top scorer of the tournament, gaining 36 points.

Statistics

References

South African rugby union players
Living people
1994 births
People from Hessequa Local Municipality
Rugby union scrum-halves
Rugby union fly-halves
Rugby union fullbacks
SWD Eagles players
Southern Kings players
Rugby union players from the Western Cape